Martyrs' Square may refer to:

 Martyrs' Square, Beirut, Lebanon
 Martyrs' Square, Brussels, Belgium
 Martyrs' Square, Damascus, a.k.a. Marjeh Square, Syria
 Martyrs' Square, on Quwatli Street in Homs, Syria
 Martyrs' Square, Tripoli, Libya, known historically by the names Green Square, Independence Square, and Piazza Italia
 Piazza dei Martiri, a martyrs' monument square in Naples, Italy
 Place des Martyrs, Luxembourg, a garden square in Luxembourg City, Luxembourg